Nokia 1280 is an affordable ultrabasic dual band GSM mobile phone made by Nokia announced in November 2009 and released in March 2010 for developing countries. It has a classic candybar design, intended to be lightweight and durable.
Its related twin is Nokia 103, which is shipped in small quantities in developed markets.

Handset specifications 
 Standby time: 528 hours
 Talk time: 8 hours and 30 mins
 Network: 2G Network 800/900/1800 MHz
 Vibrating alert: (optional)
 Speed Dialing
 Internal antenna

Other features
Built-in stereo FM radio, speakerphone, flashlight, calendar, predictive text input, exchangeable color covers, and three games (Bold games specify their availability at a certain region: Bounce, Rapid Roll, Snake Xenzia, Beach Rally).

References 

 http://www.gsmarena.com/nokia_1280-3008.php 
 http://www.phonearena.com/phones/Nokia-1280_id4203 
 http://www.cgena.com/6827-det/Check-Price/Nokia-1280.aspx

1280
Nokia phones 1000 series
Mobile phones introduced in 2009
Mobile phones with user-replaceable battery